In mathematics, specifically commutative algebra, a divided power structure is a way of making expressions of the form  meaningful even when it is not possible to actually divide by .

Definition 

Let A be a commutative ring with an ideal I. A divided power structure (or PD-structure, after the French puissances divisées) on I is a collection of maps  for n = 0, 1, 2, ... such that:

For convenience of notation,  is often written as  when it is clear what divided power structure is meant.

The term divided power ideal refers to an ideal with a given divided power structure, and divided power ring refers to a ring with a given ideal with divided power structure.

Homomorphisms of divided power algebras are ring homomorphisms that respects the divided power structure on its source and target.

Examples 

 If A is an algebra over  then every ideal I has a unique divided power structure where   Indeed, this is the example which motivates the definition in the first place.

 If M is an A-module, let  denote the symmetric algebra of M over A. Then its dual  has a canonical structure of divided power ring.

Constructions

If A is any ring, there exists a divided power ring

consisting of divided power polynomials in the variables

that is sums of divided power monomials of the form

Here the divided power ideal is the set of divided power polynomials with constant coefficient 0.

More generally, if M is an A-module, there is a universal A-algebra, called

with PD ideal

and an A-linear map

(The case of divided power polynomials is the special case in which M is a free module over A of finite rank.)

If I is any ideal of a ring A, there is a universal construction which extends A with divided powers of elements of I to get a divided power envelope of I in A.

Applications 

The divided power envelope is a fundamental tool in the theory of PD differential operators and crystalline cohomology, where it is used to overcome technical difficulties which arise in positive characteristic.

The divided power functor is used in the construction of co-Schur functors.

See also 

 Crystalline cohomology

References 

 
 
p-adic derived de Rham cohomology - contains excellent material on PD-polynomial rings and PD-envelopes
What's the name for the analogue of divided power algebras for x^i/i - contains useful equivalence to divided power algebras as dual algebras

Commutative algebra
Polynomials